The 2011 Challengers Cup is South Korea's league cup competition for the Challengers League clubs. 2011 season is first ever season of Challengers Cup. The competition was begun on 5 August 2011, and ended on 13 August 2011.

Match Results

Bracket

First round
The draw for the first round was held on 21 July 2011.

Quarterfinals

Semifinals

Final

Winners

References

See also
 2011 Challengers League

Challengers Cup seasons
2011 domestic association football cups
2011 in South Korean sport